Linenhall is an area in the north inner city of Dublin, Ireland which was previously the site of a complex of buildings and streets associated with the linen trade. It was also temporarily a barracks, and was largely destroyed during the Easter Rising in 1916.

Area 
The area known as Linenhall built up around the historical market hall, and the series of streets which now comprise the area reflect those connections particularly with northern counties and areas of Ireland. Extant streets include Coleraine Street, Lurgan Street, and Lisburn Street. Derry Street to the north of Linenhall was built over when the hall expanded in 1781. There are also streets named for the building, Linenhall Street, Linenhall Terrace, Linenhall Parade, and Yarnhall Street.

Foundation
Linenhall, also spelt Linen Hall, was a complex of Georgian buildings at the top of Capel Street, built by the Linen Board. The selection of this three-acre site as a centralised Linen Hall for Dublin was decided by the Board on 17 March 1722 following the rejection of sites in Drumcondra and Ballybough. Many linen traders would stay in the inns and taverns in the environs of Capel Street at this time. Construction began, and the Hall was opened for business on 14 November 1728. The complex was originally designed by Thomas Burgh, and later enlarged in 1784 by Thomas Cooley. A Yarn Hall and Cotton Hall were also constructed nearby.

The complex was modelled on Blackwell Hill, London, and the Cloth Hall of Hamburg. The Dublin Linenhall housed 550 bays for storage, a large trading space, and a boardroom. Following the opening of the Belfast Linen Hall in 1783, the Dublin Hall went into decline. The Linen Board was disbanded in 1828.

Barracks

From the 1870s, the Hall was used as a British Army barracks. The Board of Works took over the buildings in 1878.

In 1914, the Hall, along with the nearby Temple Gardens in front of the Kings Inns, was host to one its last events, the Dublin Civic Exhibition.

It is mentioned in the 1958 song "Monto (Take Her Up to Monto)", which references events of the late 19th century: "You've seen the Dublin Fusiliers, / The dirty old bamboozeleers, / De Wet'll kill them chiselers, one, two, three. / Marching from the Linen Hall / There's one for every cannonball, / And Vicky's going to send them all, o'er the sea."

On 26 April 1916, Linenhall Barracks was seized by the Irish Volunteers. The Barracks was largely occupied by unarmed clerks. The Barracks was set on fire by 1st Dublin Battalion Irish Volunteers to prevent the British Army using the site. The fire spread to adjacent buildings on Great Brunswick Street and North King Street. During the fire, Volunteer Paddy Holohan reported the fire leading to the explosion of several barrels of oil, creating large plumes of thick smoke.

Present

Remnants of the original complex can be seen in the Linenhall campus of the Technological University Dublin off Yarnhall Street.

References

1916 fires in Europe
Demolished buildings and structures in Dublin
Buildings and structures in Dublin (city)
Buildings and structures demolished in 1916
Places in Dublin (city)